Walid Abdel Maksoud (born 14 June 1979) is an Egyptian handball player. He competed in the 2008 Summer Olympics.

References

1979 births
Living people
Handball players at the 2008 Summer Olympics
Egyptian male handball players
Olympic handball players of Egypt